Black Woman with Peonies is a painting by Frédéric Bazille, produced in late spring 1870, a few months before the outbreak of the Franco-Prussian War, in which he would die. It has been in the Musée Fabre in Montpellier since 1918. It is an oil on canvas and its dimensions are 60.3 cm (23.7 in) × 75.2 cm (29.6 in).

In the year that he painted it, Bazille created another, similar, image with the same model, currently in the collection of the National Gallery of Art. He may have conceived both works as a tribute to Manet. Both paintings make use of peonies, a type of flower Édouard Manet grew in his garden and painted frequently. In one of his most famous paintings, Olympia, Manet depicted a black servant bringing a bouquet of peonies to a reclining prostitute.

The model who posed for Bazille is unidentified, but is the same model who posed for Thomas Eakins's painting Female Model (1867–1869), in which she wears the same headscarf and earring seen in Young Woman with Peonies.

References

Paintings in the collection of the Musée Fabre
1870 paintings
Paintings by Frédéric Bazille